The Business Central Towers form a complex of two 51-floor towers in Dubai Media City in Dubai, United Arab Emirates. Both towers were topped out in November 2007 and were completed in early 2008. Originally named the Al Kazim Tower Towers, the towers were renamed as the Business Central Towers, a more friendly name for all foreign companies in both buildings.

See also 
 List of tallest buildings in Dubai

References

External links
 Business Central Towers on Emporis

Buildings and structures in Dubai Media City
Office buildings completed in 2008
Twin towers
Skyscraper office buildings in Dubai